Vadodara–Dahod MEMU is a MEMU train of the Indian Railways, which runs between Dahod railway station in Gujarat and Vadodara Junction railway station in Gujarat. It is currently being operated with 69119/69120 train numbers on weekly basis.

Average speed and frequency

The 69119/Vadodara–Dahod MEMU runs with an average speed of 38 km/h and completes 147 km in 3h 55m. The 69120/Dahod–Vadodara MEMU runs with an average speed of 43 km/h and completes 147 km in 3h 25m.

Route and halts

The important halts of the train are:

See also 

 Dahod railway station
 Vadodara Junction railway station
 Ujjain–Nagda MEMU
 Dahod–Ratlam MEMU

Notes

References

External links 

 69119/Vadodara-Dahod MEMU
 69120/Dahod–Vadodara MEMU

Transport in Dahod
Transport in Vadodara
Electric multiple units in Gujarat